Heninger is a surname. It is the surname of:
Earl Heninger, most valuable player for Purdue in the 1952 Big Ten Conference football season
Eugène Heninger, cyclist in the 1914 Tour de France
Howard P. Heninger, president of Calgary Alberta Temple
Nadia Heninger, American cryptographer
Nick Heninger, freshman player on the 2016 Utah Utes football team
Otto Heninger, alias of Nazi official Adolf Eichmann
Owen P. Heninger, superintendent in the 1940s of the Utah State Hospital
William K. Heninger, representative in the 2nd Arizona Territorial Legislature

See also
Heninger Elementary School, in Santa Ana, California
Henninger